Haliotis drogini is a species of sea snail, a marine gastropod mollusc in the family Haliotidae, the abalones.

References

External links
 World Register of Marine Species

drogini
Gastropods described in 2012